Mohamed Ramah (born 2 January 1986) is a Moroccan sports shooter. He competed in the men's trap and double trap events at the 2016 Summer Olympics.

References

External links
 

1986 births
Living people
Moroccan male sport shooters
Olympic shooters of Morocco
Shooters at the 2016 Summer Olympics
Place of birth missing (living people)